The 2014 Kor Royal Cup was the 79th Kor Royal Cup, an annual football match contested by the winners of the previous season's Thai Premier League and Thai FA Cup competitions.  The match was played at Suphanburi Stadium, Suphanburi and contested by 2013 Thai Premier League champions Buriram United, and 2013 Thai Premier League runners-up Muangthong United, as Buriram also won the 2013 Thai FA Cup. On January 21, with less than two week before the start of the tournament, the 2014 Kor Royal Cup were moved from the capital Bangkok to Suphanburi because the 2013–14 Thai political crisis .

Details

Assistant referees:
 Binla Preeda
 Amnad Phongmanee
Fourth official:
 Chaiya Mahapab

See also
 2014 Thai Premier League
 2014 Thai Division 1 League
 2014 Regional League Division 2
 2014 Thai FA Cup
 2014 Thai League Cup
 Thai Premier League All-Star Football

References

Kor
2014